The 1997–98 Nicholls State Colonels men's basketball team represents Nicholls State University in the 1997–98 NCAA Division I men's basketball season. The Colonels, led by eighth-year head coach Rickey Broussard, played their home games at Stopher Gymnasium in Thibodaux, Louisiana as members of the Southland Conference. After running off 14 straight wins to begin conference play, the Colonels finished atop the conference regular season standings with a 15–1 record in Southland play. They followed that by winning the Southland tournament to receive an automatic bid to the NCAA tournament. Playing as the No. 16 seed in the West region, Nicholls State lost to No. 1 seed and defending National champion Arizona.

Roster

Source:

Schedule and results

|-
!colspan=12 style=|Non-conference regular season

|-
!colspan=12 style=|Southland regular season

|-
!colspan=9 style=| Southland Tournament

|-
!colspan=9 style=| NCAA Tournament

Source:

References

Nicholls Colonels men's basketball seasons
Nicholls State Colonels
Nicholls State
Nicholls Colonels men's basketball
Nicholls Colonels men's basketball